Ondřej Vrabec (born 1979) is a Czech conductor and horn player, currently solo horn of the Czech Philharmonic Orchestra. From 2022 season he will become Chief Conductor of the Karlovy Vary Symphony Orchestra.

Biography
Vřabec studied at the Prague Conservatoire: horn with Prof. Bedřich Tylšar and conducting with Profs. Vladimír Válek, Hynek Farkač, Miriam Němcová and M. Košler. He also studied conducting at the Academy of Performing Arts in Prague, under Radomil Eliška and Jiří Bělohlávek. He was additionally mentored in conducting by Sir John Eliot Gardiner, Benjamin Zander and others.

Vřabec first played as solo horn of the Czech Philharmonic Orchestra at the age of 17, taking the position permanently two years later. He has remained in post ever since. As a chamber musician he has been a member of the Ensemble à Vent Maurice Bourgue, Juventus Quintet, the Czech Philharmonic Horn Club, Brahms Trio Prague and the PhilHarmonia Octet, the latter two still being active. As soloist he has appeared widely, including with Czech Philharmonic Orchestra, Antwerp Symphony Orchestra, Nagoya Philharmonic Orchestra, Bavarian Chamber Orchestra, Sólistes Européenes Luxembourg, China National Center for the Performing Arts Orchestra, Augsburg Philharmonic Orchestra, State Philharmonic Košice, Rzeszow Philharmonic and Lviv Philharmonic.

He has also acted as Assistant Conductor at the Czech Philharmonic Orchestra for many years - in fact, only Jiří Bělohlávek has conducted them more this century. He also regularly cooperates with the majority of Czech orchestras including the Prague Philharmonia, Moravian Philharmonic, Janáček Philharmonic Orchestra and Filharmonie Bohuslava Martinů. Past guest appearances with foreign ensembles have included Japan Philharmonic Orchestra, New Japan Philharmonic, Reykjavik Chamber Orchestra, State Philharmonic Košice, Galeria Wind Orchestra Tokyo, London Soloists Chamber Orchestra, Danish National Symphony Orchestra, State Philharmonic Oradea and Lviv Virtuosi. He is on the permanent conducting roster for Ostrava Days International New Music Festival, and has conducted at the Prague Spring International Music Festival, with Junges Klangforum Mitte Europa, at the International Music Festival Český Krumlov and at Sir John Eliot Gardiner's Anima Mundi Festival in Pisa with Brno Philharmonic Orchestra. He toured South Korea and China in 2011 and 2012 with Prague Philharmonia; the orchestra's first tours of these countries. His opera performances include world premieres of Lists of Infinity by Martin Smolka, Encounter by Mojiao Wang and Protracted Sinuous Movement of a Longitudinal Object by Petr Cigler.

Vrabec has released more than twenty CDs as player and conductor. His 2020 disc ″British Works for Horn″ (Sheva Contemporary, UK) featured music by Robin Holloway and Peter Seabourne, and was reviewed in Gramophone, BBC Music Magazine, Limelight and others. A further disc of horn quintets was released in 2022 and reviewed in Gramophone, BBC Music Magazine,Limelight and others. He recorded the complete symphonies of Andrew Downes with Czech Philharmonic Orchestra (Artesmon/Czech Philharmonic label), The Planets by Gustav Holst and Symphony No. 2 by Arthur Honegger (Octavia Records, Japan), and viola concerti by Carl Stamitz (Supraphon Czech Republic). He often prepares the Czech Philharmonic Orchestra prior to appearances by guest conductors such as Sir John Eliot Gardiner, Valery Gergiev, Manfred Honeck and Jiří Bělohlávek.

Many orchestral and chamber works have been written for Vrabec. He has a special, ongoing interest in British composers Peter Seabourne and Robin Holloway, both of whom have written him multiple works. He premiered Seabourne's Double Concerto for Horn and Orchestra in Olomouc (2012), broadcast by Czech Radio Vltava, and conducted the premiere of the same composer's 2nd Piano Concerto in Prague (2016).

References

External links
 Ondřej Vrabec official website
Czech Philharmonic Orchestra
Czech Music Quarterly - interview

Living people
1979 births
Czech conductors (music)